Sylvia Leonora, Lady Brooke, Ranee of Sarawak (born The Hon. Sylvia Leonora Brett, 25 February 1885 – 11 November 1971), was an English aristocrat who became the consort to Sir Charles Vyner de Windt Brooke, Rajah of Sarawak, the last of the White Rajahs.

Early life
Brett was born at No. 1, Tilney Street, Park Lane, Central London, the second daughter of Reginald Baliol Brett, the 2nd Viscount Esher, KCB.  Her mother Eleanor was the third daughter of the Belgian politician and revolutionary Sylvain Van de Weyer and his wife Elizabeth, who was the only child of the great financier Joshua Bates of Barings Bank. Sylvia grew up at the family home, Orchard Lea, at Cranbourne in Winkfield parish in Berkshire. Her paternal grandmother Eugénie Meyer was French, born in Lyons.

Sylvia Brett grew up in a troubled household. She was ignored by her courtier father, who was far more interested in flirting with young men than being a parent. Sylvia and her sister Dot had to suffer starvation of affection, and she decided to "electrify the world" when she grew up.

Ranee of Sarawak
Brett married His Highness Rajah Vyner of Sarawak at St Peter's Church, Cranbourne, Berkshire, just before her 26th birthday on 21 February 1911. They first met in 1909 when she joined an all-female choral orchestra, established by Vyner's mother. She first visited Sarawak in 1912, where her husband (from 1917) ruled a  jungle kingdom on the northern side of Borneo with a population of 500,000, an ethnic mix of Chinese, Malays, and the headhunting Dayak. Brett was invested with the titles of Ranee of Sarawak on 24 May 1917 and Grand Master of The Most Illustrious Order of the Star of Sarawak on 1 August 1941. Rajah Vyner died in 1963.

Brett was distraught that her eldest daughter, Leonora, under Islamic law, could not take the throne; as a result she hatched various plots to blacken the name of the heir apparent, Anthony, the Rajah Muda.

She was known for having Machiavellian machinations, which agitated the British Colonial Office. Brett always had designs on her husband's succession because her daughters, as women, were not able to become a ruler of Sarawak. "Her own brother described her as a “female Iago” because she was the family nuisance and great schemer."

Richard Halliburton, the celebrated adventurer, met her as he circumnavigated the globe in 1932 with his pilot, Moye Stephens. She became the first woman in Sarawak to fly when the pair gave her a flight in their biplane, the Flying Carpet. Halliburton narrates an account of the visit in his book of the same name.

Sylvia Brett enjoyed dressing up in sarongs and exotic jewelry and decorated her London home with spears, totem poles.

Brett was the author of eleven books, including "Sylvia of Sarawak" and "Queen of the Head-Hunters" (1970). Fort Sylvia in Kapit is named in her honour. She also contributed short stories to publications such as John O'London's Weekly, for example "The Debt Collector", in the Summer Reading Number June 29, 1929.

Children
Brett was survived by three daughters:
 Dayang Leonora Margaret, Countess of Inchcape, wife of Kenneth Mackay, 2nd Earl of Inchcape (by whom she had a son, Lord Tanlaw, and a daughter), and later wife of Colonel Francis Parker Tompkins (by whom she had a son).
 Dayang Elizabeth, a RADA educated singer and actress, wife of firstly Harry Roy (with whom she had a son, David Roy and daughter, Roberta Simpson), secondly, Richard Vidmer until her death.
 Dayang Nancy Valerie, an actress, known for The Charge of the Light Brigade (1936 film), wife of firstly, Robert Gregory, an American wrestler; secondly, José Pepi Cabarro – a Spanish businessman; thirdly, Andrew Aitken Macnair (one son, Stewart, born 1952); and fourthly, Memery Whyatt.  She died in Florida.

Sister
Brett's elder sister Dorothy Brett (1883–1977), known as Brett, went to the Slade School of Art in 1910 and became friends with painters Dora Carrington (1893-1932) and  Mark Gertler (1891–1939), and then with salon hostess Lady Ottoline Morrell (1873–1938) and the Bloomsbury group, living for a while at Garsington Manor. In 1924 she went to live on a mountain ranch near Taos, New Mexico, with D.H. Lawrence and his wife Frieda, partially fulfilling Lawrence's dream of establishing an artists' colony.

Ancestors

See also
 List of Sarawakian consorts
 White Rajahs
 Kingdom of Sarawak

References

Further reading
Maurice V. Brett (ed.), Journals and Letters of Reginald Viscount Esher, Vol I: 1870–1903, London, 1934.
Margaret Brooke, My Life in Sarawak, 1913.
Sylvia of Sarawak: an autobiography, 1936.
Sylvia, Lady Brooke, Queen of the Headhunters, 1970.
Philip Eade, Sylvia, Queen Of The Headhunters: An Outrageous Englishwoman And Her Lost Kingdom, (352 pages), Weidenfeld & Nicolson, 2007. Lynne Truss, reviewed Eade's book in The Sunday Times, 17 June 2007.
Sean Hignett, Brett: From Bloomsbury to New Mexico, A Biography, London, Hodder & Stoughton, 1984.
R.H.W. Reece, The Name of Brooke: The End of White Rajah Rule in Sarawak, 1993.
S. Runciman, The White Rajahs: A History of Sarawak from 1841 to 1946, Cambridge University Press, 1960

External links
 An essay on Silvia Brooke in The Daily Telegraph (UK), Saturday 2 June 2007, by Philip Eade.
 National Portrait Gallery, London Photographic images of the Brookes by Bassano; Ottoline Morrell; and Paul Tanqueray, 1917 and 1932.

1885 births
1971 deaths
Raj of Sarawak
English women writers
English biographers
History of Sarawak
Sylvia Brooke
English autobiographers
People from Winkfield
Sylvia Brooke
Brett, Sylvia
Brett, Sylvia
Recipients of the Order of the Star of Sarawak
Wives of knights